Madame Récamier or Juliette Recamier (1777-1849) was a historical French figure.

Madame Récamier may also refer to:
 Madame Récamier (1920 film), a German silent film
 Madame Récamier (1928 film), a French silent film